Kushki (also Romanized as Kūshkī; also known as Kūnskī) is a village in Azari Rural District, in the Central District of Esfarayen County, North Khorasan Province, Iran. At the 2006 census, its population was 1,079, in 282 families.

References 

Populated places in Esfarayen County